The 2014 AFF Championship, sponsored by Suzuki and officially known as the 2014 AFF Suzuki Cup, was the 10th edition of the AFF Championship, an international association football competition consisting of national teams of member nations of the ASEAN Football Federation (AFF).

Co-hosting rights to the group stages were awarded to Singapore and Vietnam with matches held from 22 November to 20 December 2014. Meanwhile, Malaysia, the Philippines and Thailand also hosted knockout stage matches, as their teams advanced to the semi-finals with Vietnam. 

Singapore were the defending champions, but were eliminated in the group stage. Thailand won the tournament 4–3 in a two-legged final against Malaysia, with manager Kiatisuk Senamuang being the first coach to win the competition also as a player.

Hosts
Singapore and Vietnam were announced as co-hosts of the group stage by the AFF Council on 3 April 2013. Initially the Philippines and Indonesia were also considered as possible co-hosts.

Venues

Qualification

Qualification was to have been scrapped for this edition of the tournament, but at the AFF Council Meeting in Naypyidaw, Myanmar in December 2013, it was decided that the qualifying round would be retained, and Laos were awarded the hosting rights. It was to involve the five lower ranked teams in the region, with games taking place between the dates of 12–20 October 2014.

In August 2013, Football Federation Australia became a full member of the AFF, thus making them eligible to compete in the ASEAN Football Championship starting with this edition of the tournament. However, Australia had no plans to compete against lower-ranked teams in AFF Championship and that they would continue to play in future editions of the EAFF East Asian Cup.

Qualified teams
The following eight teams qualified for the tournament.

Draw
The draw for the tournament was held on 5 August 2014 in Hanoi, Vietnam.

Squads

Final tournament

Group stage

Tie-breaking criteria
Ranking in each group shall be determine as follows:
 Greater number of points obtained in all the group matches;
 Goal difference in all the group matches;
 Greater number of goals scored in all the group matches.
If two or more teams are equal on the basis on the above three criteria, the place shall be determined as follows:
 Result of the direct match between the teams in question;
 Penalty shoot-out if only two teams were tied and they met in the last round of the group;
 Drawing lots by the Organising Committee.

Group A

 All matches were played in Vietnam.
 Times listed are local (UTC+7)

Group B

 All matches were played in Singapore.
 Times listed are local (UTC+8)
Due to problems with the pitch at the Singapore National Stadium, the ASEAN Football Federation have decided on using a second venue, the Jalan Besar Stadium, for Group B matches.

Notes

Knockout stage

Semi-finals
First Leg

Second Leg

Thailand won 3–0 on aggregate.

Malaysia won 5–4 on aggregate.

Finals

First Leg

Second Leg

Thailand won 4–3 on aggregate.

Statistics

Winners

Awards

Discipline
In the final tournament, a player was suspended for the subsequent match in the competition for either getting a red card, or accumulating two yellow cards in two different matches.

*Players who received a card during the final are not included here.

Goalscorers

Team statistics
This table will show the ranking of teams throughout the tournament.

Media coverage

Incidents and controversies
During a group match between Singapore and Malaysia at the Singapore National Stadium, irate Singaporean fans began throwing bottles of water and toilet rolls on the pitch and players gate tunnel at the end of the match due to what was seen as awful decision-making by Oman referee Ahmed Al-Kaf, who awarded the Malaysian side a penalty kick resulting in an advantage for them.

Other incidents occurred soon during the first semi-final between Malaysia and Vietnam in Shah Alam Stadium, where some of the Malaysian fans were seen pointing green laser lights on the field, as recorded on the match video in television camera. The laser incident is a continuation from Malaysian hooligans, as it also happened during the previous edition of AFF Championship semi-final against Vietnam and in the final against Indonesia in 2010.

At the end of Malaysia 1–2 loss to Vietnam, some Malaysian hooligan fans began attacking Vietnamese fans, resulting in injuries. The hooligans rushed to assault Vietnamese fans, who tried to flee and had no intention of fighting back. Bottles, smoke bombs and other dangerous objects continued to get thrown even after the Royal Malaysia Police arrived at the scene to quell the scuffles. This was heavily criticised by the Vietnamese side for the rioting shown by some of the Malaysian supporters. As a result, the website of the Football Association of Malaysia (FAM) had been hacked in a denial of service attack, perhaps from Vietnam. Other Malaysian supporters together with the Malaysia Minister of Youth and Sports, Khairy Jamaluddin condemn the hooligan fans attitude and has offer their apologies to all Vietnamese fans, adding that five of the perpetrators had been arrested. Another nine people's was arrested for the same offence between 11–12 December.

The Philippines team received a death threat before their 2nd semi-final match against Thailand. Sources say the threat has something to do with the scuffle during 1st leg between Filipino defender Amani Aguinaldo and Thai striker Adisak Kraisorn, which led to Adisak being red-carded and suspended for the 2nd leg.

In the semi-final between Malaysia and Vietnam, the Vietnam had won the first-leg in Malaysia with a 2–1 score. However, in the second-leg played in Hanoi, Vietnam lost 2–4, thus losing 4–5 on aggregate with Malaysia advancing to the finals. After that defeat, the Vietnam Football Federation (VFF) launched a probe into the defeat, citing potential match-fixing due to the seemingly apathetic performance of the players compared to the first-leg.  However, the AFF said that the match was not fixed and went on to say that through Swiss-based sports integrity specialist Sportradar, no unusual betting had taken place during the match.

References

External links
 Tournament Website The Official Tournament Website
 ASEAN Football Federation The Official Federation Website

 
AFF Championship tournaments
AFF Championship
AFF Championship
AFF Championship
2014
2014